Export torpedoes of China are Chinese-built torpedoes intended for international export. The series of torpedoes has the prefix "ET" and has been developed by the Chinese marine industrial company CSOC for export only. These torpedoes may have their domestic use correspondence but this is generally not officially admitted.  Some of them have seen wide use by the navies of other countries.

^ Italics are not officially published parameters

References

Torpedoes of China
Foreign trade of China